The Colorado Baptist General Convention (CBGC) is the autonomous state convention for the state of Colorado that is under the umbrella of the Southern Baptist Convention.  It was formed, in 1955, out of the Arizona Southern Baptist Convention, pursuant to a motion submitted at the Arizona convention by Roy Sutton (at the time a convention staff member who was later to be executive director and treasurer).  At the time, the Arizona convention covered a quarter of the whole United States, by area.

Affiliated Organizations 
Baptist Foundation of Colorado
Ponderosa Retreat and Conference Center
Rocky Mountain Baptist - State Newspaper
Rocky Mountain Campus of Golden Gate Baptist Theological Seminary

References

Further reading 
 
 

Baptist Christianity in Colorado
Conventions associated with the Southern Baptist Convention
Christian organizations established in 1955
Baptist denominations established in the 20th century
1955 establishments in Colorado